The 71st Hong Kong–Macau Interport is an association football match held in Hong Kong on 14 November 2015. Hong Kong captured their 55th title by winning 2–0.

Squads

Hong Kong

Macau

Results

References

Hong Kong–Macau Interport
Macau
Hong